United Nations Security Council Resolution 100, adopted unanimously on October 27, 1953, after receiving a report from the Chief of Staff of the United Nations Truce Supervision Organization in Palestine the Council found it desirable that work in the demilitarized zone should be suspended.  The Council further said it relies on the Chief of Staff of the TSO to inform it regarding the fulfillment of that undertaking.

See also
Bnot Ya'akov Bridge
National Water Carrier of Israel
List of United Nations Security Council Resolutions 1 to 100 (1946–1953)
List of United Nations Security Council Resolutions 101 to 200 (1953–1965)

References
Text of the Resolution at undocs.org

External links
 

 0100
 0100
October 1953 events